José Treviño may refer to:
 José Luis Treviño (born 1955), Mexican politician
 José Treviño (footballer) (born 1960), Mexican former professional European football player
 Jose Trevino (baseball) (born 1992), American professional baseball catcher
 José Treviño Morales, Mexican money launderer

See also
 Treviño (surname)